Jermyn or Germyn may refer to:

People
 Henry Jermyn, 1st Earl of St Albans (c. 1604 – 1684)
 Thomas Jermyn, 2nd Baron Jermyn (died 1703), English Member of Parliament, nephew of Henry Jermyn
 Henry Jermyn, 1st Baron Dover (c. 1636 – 1708)
 Hugh Jermyn (1820-1903), Anglican bishop
 Carsen Germyn (born 1982), Canadian ice hockey player
 Germyn Lynch (fl.1441-1483), merchant and entrepreneur from Galway, Ireland
 German Gardiner, sometimes spelt Jermyn Gardiner, executed 1544 for alleged involvement in a plot against Thomas Cranmer; beatified
 Arthur Jermyn, title character of H.P. Lovecraft's short story "Facts Concerning the Late Arthur Jermyn and His Family"

Places
 Jermyn Street, London
 Jermyn, Pennsylvania, a borough
 Jermyn, Texas, an unincorporated community